ZZR may refer to:

 Kawasaki ZZR series of motorcycles
 Isuzu Gemini ZZ/R or ZZ-R
 Target allocation radar TPS-1E (German: Zielzuweisungsradar)
 A special vehicle in Out of Sight (1966 film)